The Poor School and Workhouse Theatre was a drama school situated in King's Cross, London, United Kingdom.

The Poor School was created in 1986 by former Royal Central School of Speech and Drama vocal coach Barbara Caister in response to the need for first-class acting training which was financially within the reach of all, or almost all, and later taken over by her son, Paul Caister who ran the school for over 30 years. The two-year training programme at the school was in operation for 32 years, with graduates enjoying careers in theatre, film, radio, stage and comedy; ex-students have founded their own companies (Ridiculusmus and Sturdy Beggars, most notably) and have become producers, directors, casting directors and agents.

The Poor School was not accredited by Drama UK and did not issue diplomas or certifications.

It was announced in November 2016 that The Poor School was no longer accepting new students and the school closed at the end of July 2018. Its founder declined to comment on the reasons for the closure.

The school offered a 2-year training programme and short courses.

Shortly before The Poor School closed its doors, several long-serving staff members established The School in nearby Canonbury, offering a two-year acting training and short courses. Like The Poor School, training at The School is timetabled around evenings and weekends to allow students to work and earn whilst they train.

Alumni

Arron Blake
Sarah Frankcom – Director, Royal Exchange, Manchester
Ricky Groves
James Holmes – actor in the BBC sitcom Miranda
Jenny Kendall-Tobias – British Radio Presenter (BBC Guernsey)
Zoe Lyons – Stand-Up Comic
Lindsay Armaou – Member of pop band B*witched
Francis Magee 
Ryan Molloy – Jersey Boys in West End
Lucy Russell 
Mark Wakeling – Co Founder Actors' Temple
Jessie Wallace – EastEnders
Sasha Behar 
 Micah Balfour
 Howard Antony 
 William Beck – Casualty
 Vera Chok – theatre, screen and radio actor.
 Andrew Novell
 Don Johnson - star of 'Ricky's Gone Live' on Japanese National Television

References

External links
The Poor School website
 Sarah Frankcom, Royal Exchange Credits
 Francis Magee on IMDb
 Ridiculumus
 Poor School Reviews
 The School website
 Heather J. Taylor on IMDb

Educational institutions established in 1986
Performing arts education in London
Drama schools in London
Education in the London Borough of Camden
1986 establishments in England